Mark Yardley (born 14 September 1969) is a Scottish former professional footballer who played as a striker.

During his time with St Mirren, he scored 66 goals in 224 league appearances. He also had spells at Cowdenbeath, Forfar Athletic (loan) and Albion Rovers.

Yardley was one of four former players voted by St Mirren supporters to have a street named in his honour – Yardley Avenue – following a public competition run by Renfrewshire Council to name the streets at the former Love Street ground being developed by Sanctuary Scotland into affordable housing.

He appeared for St Mirren in a five-a-side Masters Football style tournament at Braehead in 2007 as part of Hugh Murray's Testimonial.

References

External links

1969 births
Living people
Sportspeople from Livingston, West Lothian
Association football forwards
Scottish footballers
Cowdenbeath F.C. players
St Mirren F.C. players
Forfar Athletic F.C. players
Scottish Premier League players
Scottish Football League players
Footballers from West Lothian
East Fife F.C. players
Albion Rovers F.C. players
Livingston United F.C. players